David Guez (born 8 December 1982) is a French tennis player. He achieved a career-high singles ranking of World No. 116 in July 2010.

Career
At the 2009 Grand Prix de Tennis de Lyon he won with Rajeev Ram and reached to the second round, where he lost with Gilles Simon. In his best win to date, he beat Stanislas Wawrinka 6–3, 6–4 in the 2009 BNP Paribas Masters. In the second round of that tournament, he lost 4–6, 5–7, against his compatriot Gaël Monfils.

He has reached the final of seventeen Futures tournaments; in twelve of these he was victorious. David won the one of ATP Challenger Tour tournaments (in St. Petersburg, where he defeated Édouard Roger-Vasselin in the final).

He qualified for his only Grand Slam tournament on 15 January 2010 (after winning against Ruben Bemelmans, Dayne Kelly and Édouard Roger-Vasselin in the qualifications). However, he lost to Julien Benneteau in the first round.

In 2014, he again made his way through qualifying, defeating Hiroki Moriya, Lorenzo Giustino and 32nd seed Yūichi Sugita to make it into the main draw of the 2014 Australian Open. He was defeated by countryman Richard Gasquet in the first round.

Singles finals

Wins (16)

Runner-up (7)

Singles performance timeline

External links

References 

1982 births
Living people
French male tennis players
Jewish tennis players